The 2003 German Figure Skating Championships took place on January 3–5, 2003 in Oberstdorf. Skaters competed in the disciplines of men's singles, ladies' singles, pair skating, ice dancing, and synchronized skating.

Results

Men

Ladies

Pairs

Ice dancing

Synchronized

External links
 2003 German Championships results

German Figure Skating Championships, 2003
German Figure Skating Championships